David Leviathan (born 6 August 1950) is an Israeli painter, sculptor, and poet.

Biography
David Leviathan was born and grew up in Kibbutz Givat Brenner in Israel. Right after completing his military service, in the year 1972, he attended the Avni Institute of Fine Arts. During his studies there, he became an assistant of his teacher – master, the artist Yehezkel Streichman, and later on he was teaching there himself.

In the year 1977 he gave up painting and for the next two years was occupied with trying to compare the monthly cycle in women to cycles in nature, by creating different kinds of 3-dimensional objects.

Towards the end of 1979, he moved to Amsterdam, and while being touched by the book The Fall, written by Albert Camus, he composed oil paintings trying to deal with Camus thoughts, and thus titled his first one-man show in Amsterdam, "The Fall".

During the following years, while using the Four Elements (Air, Water, Fire & Earth) as a major theme for his abstracts and Human Heads (some of them painted on huge canvases, like 350x300 cm` and similar), he used to spend two weeks every year (1981–1989) on a Greek island (each year on a different one), letting a donkey carry his equipment while travelling, to achieve a greater perspective for developing his work, relating those Vibrant Elements and Heads.

In the year 1992, Leviathan received Dutch citizenship, and the next two years he was travelling between Amsterdam and Paris, living and working in them both. He moved back (temporarily?) to Israel to create, and the white color started taking a major part in his work.

A major motif in his work is questioning death within the cyclicality of Life and Death, in which he uses a lot of images of old women, devoting special attention to their facial expressions, and in many cases befogging the images, trying to comprehend as deep as possible spiritual feeling, to create a certain type of atmosphere, and, in some cases it is the tension point between coming to fruition and withering.

Selected exhibitions

Solo exhibitions 
1978 – Sara Levi Gallery, Tel Aviv
1979 – "The Third Floor Gallery", Jaffa
1979 – "New gallery", Tel Aviv
1980 – Galerie "Artes", Amsterdam
1986 – Galerie "De Looier", Amsterdam
1989 – Sara Levi gallery, Tel Aviv
1991 – Galerie Witteveen, Amsterdam
1991 – Smith Andersen Gallery, Palo Alto, California
1991 – "De Gele Rijder" Kunst centrum, Arnhem
1992 – "The Work Shop", Paris
1992 – Museum "De Librije", Zwolle, Netherlands
1995 – Horace Richter gallery, Jaffa
1999 – Tel Aviv Performing Art Center
1999 – Givaataim Theatre (Tel Aviv)
2000 – Horace Richter gallery, Jaffa
2003 – "Artists Residence House", Herzlia, Israel
2006 – Düsseldorf cultural department, (Germany)
2010 – "Artists residence House", Hadera, Israel

Group shows
1977 – The Jerusalem Theatre gallery
1977, 1978 – Tel Aviv Museum, – winners of the AICF
1977 – Haifa Museum
1992 – "Le Genie De La Bastille", Paris
1993 – Le Grand Palais, Paris, Biannual "group 109"
1993  –  "Art International", Amsterdam and Tilburg
2004 – "Salon Des Artistes Indepandants", L`espace D`auteuil, Paris
2004 – "Salon International, M.C.A, Cannes, France
2004 – "Alternative gallery", Jaffa
2006 – Wilfried Museum, Hazorea, Israel
2013 – Salon "Business Art", Paris

Scholarships and grants
1975–1978 –  Material scholarship from AICF
1979 – Scholarship, Israeli Ministry of Education and Culture
1987–1988 – material scholarship, Netherlands Ministry of Education and culture
1989 – Werkbeurs (grant), Amsterdam municipality
1989 – Presentation beurs,  "Stichting Fonds Voor Beeldende Kunsten, Vormgeving En Bouwkunst, Netherlands
1991 – Werkbeurs, Amsterdam municipality, the Cultural department
1992–1993 – Werkbeurs, "Stichting Fonds Voor Beeldende Kunsten, Vormgeving En Bouwkunst", Netherlands
1993 – Presentatie beurs, "Prins Bernard Fonds", Amsterdam
1993–1994 – Werkbeurs, "Stichting Fonds Voor Beeldende kunsten, Vormgeving en Bouwkunst", Netherlands

See also
Visual arts in Israel

References

External links
Official website

1950 births
Living people
Israeli Jews
Israeli painters
Artists from Amsterdam